Stéphane Breitweiser (born 1 October 1971) is a French art thief and author, notorious for his art thefts between 1995 and 2001. He admitted to stealing 239 artworks and other exhibits from 172 museums while travelling around Europe and working as a waiter, an average of one theft every 15 days.  The Guardian called him "arguably the world's most consistent art thief."

He differs from most other art thieves in that he did not steal for any profit motive. He was a self-described art connoisseur who stole in order to build a vast personal collection, particularly of 16th and 17th century masters. At his trial, the magistrate quoted him as saying, "I enjoy art. I love such works of art. I collected them and kept them at home." Despite the immensity of his collection, he was still able to recall every piece he stole. He interrupted the lengthy reading of his collection during his trial several times to correct various details.

Thefts
His first theft came in March 1995 during a visit to the medieval castle at Gruyères, Switzerland, with his then-girlfriend Anne-Catherine Kleinklauss. He became entranced with a small painting by Christian Wilhelm Dietrich, later saying, "I was fascinated by her beauty, by the qualities of the woman in the portrait and by her eyes. I thought it was an imitation of Rembrandt." With his girlfriend keeping watch, he worked out the nails holding the painting in its frame and slipped it under his jacket. He would use similar methods for at least 170 other museums for his thefts in the ensuing years. He would visit small collections and regional museums, where security was lax, and Kleinklauss would serve as his lookout as he cut the paintings from their frames.

The most valuable work of art he stole was Sybille, Princess of Cleves by Lucas Cranach the Elder from a castle in Baden-Baden in 1995. Its estimated value at auction would be £5-£5.6 million. He cut it from its frame at a Sotheby's auction where it was to be sold.

Although he amassed such a large collection of art, he never attempted to sell any of it for profit, instead enjoying thinking about how he was "the wealthiest man in Europe." It was all kept in his bedroom in his mother's house in Mulhouse, France. His room was kept in semi-darkness so the sunlight would not fade the paintings. A local framer did not recognize the art which he would re-frame for Nikolaus as being some of Europe's masterpieces. His mother, Mireille Breitwieser (née Stengel), did not realize that the works were stolen and thought they were legitimately bought at auction, only later suspecting that he had not bought them legitimately.

Around 110 pieces from his collection have been recovered, leaving another 60 unaccounted for, presumed destroyed. His collection included:

 Pieter Brueghel the Younger - Cheat Profiting From His Master**, cut with scissors
 Antoine Watteau - Two Men*
 François Boucher - Sleeping Shepherd**, which Breitwieser kept by his pillow and his mother put in the garbage disposal
 Corneille de Lyon - Madeleine of France, Queen of Scotland**, garbage disposal
 David Teniers - The Monkey's Ball**, shredded with scissors
*for those that are presumed destroyed, **for those that are known to be destroyed

Breitwieser and Kleinklauss were first caught in 1997, when they walked off with a William van Aelst landscape from a private collection in a gallery, which they were allowed to see with special permission from the owner.  Alerted to the theft, the owner ran out and recognized the two as they got into Breitwieser's mother's car.  Another artifact was found in the car. Because it was his first offense on Swiss soil, he was given only an eight-month suspended sentence and banned from entering Switzerland until May 2000. However, his job was across the border from France in Switzerland, and he continued working under his mother's maiden name. He also continued his thefts, even returning to museums of prior crimes to steal again.

Capture
In November 2001, he was finally caught after stealing a bugle dating from 1584, one of only three like it in the world and with an estimated value of £45,000, from the Richard Wagner Museum in Lucerne, Switzerland.  A security guard spotted Breitwieser before he escaped.  However, he returned to the museum two days later. That day, a journalist, Erich Eisner, was walking his dog on the museum grounds when he noticed a man who seemed out of place in a nice overcoat, surveying the museum.  Aware of the recent theft, Eisner alerted the main guard, who happened to be the same guard who had seen Breitwieser at the heist and alerted the authorities, who arrested Breitwieser. Lucerne police awarded Eisner's dog a lifetime supply of food in appreciation.  Breitwieser spent two years in prison in Switzerland before being extradited to France.  However, it took Swiss authorities 19 days to acquire the international search warrant necessary to search Breitwieser's  mother's house. They found nothing, and Breitwiser did not confess until a few months later, giving authorities a detailed account of the works he had stolen.

Mireille Breitwieser's destruction of the art
When she heard of her son's arrest from Kleinklauss, who had been able to evade authorities, Mireille Breitwieser proceeded to destroy many of the works by cutting or carving them up, leaving the remains of the frames in the trash over a period of several weeks and forcing the shredded paintings down her garbage disposal unit. Other artifacts, such as vases, jewelry, pottery, and statuettes, were simply thrown into the nearby Rhone-Rhine Canal, where some were later recovered through dredging. She claimed that she destroyed the paintings out of anger at her son, but police believe it was to destroy incriminating evidence against him.  She apparently had no inkling of the large monetary value of the works she destroyed.  Police found nothing besides the cord of the stolen antique bugle when they first searched her home, and she took seven months to admit to destroying the artwork, after some pieces had washed up on the shore of the Rhine.  A Swiss police officer said, "[N]ever have so many old masters been destroyed at the same time."

Sentence
On January 7, 2005, he was sentenced to three years imprisonment by a court in Strasbourg but only served 26 months. The day before his sentencing he attempted to hang himself, but was stopped after another inmate alerted guards. His mother also received a three-year sentence for destroying the artwork, but only served 18 months, and his ex-girlfriend received 18 months with only six to serve for receiving stolen items.

Breitwieser wrote an autobiography of his exploits, titled Confessions d'un Voleur d'art ("Confessions of an Art Thief"), published in French in 2006. A German-language translation, "Bekenntnisse eines Kunstdiebes", was published by Bertelsmann, Munich in 2007.

In April 2011, the police discovered 30 more stolen works during a house search. This landed him another three-year prison sentence in 2013.

In February 2019, he was arrested again. He was under surveillance since 2016, when he tried to sell a paperweight on eBay, which was stolen from a museum in St. Louis. At his home the police found Roman coins from another museum, as well as pieces from Alsacien and German galleries. In his mother's home, €163,000 in cash was found hidden in buckets.

Additional source
(French) Vincent Noce, la Collection égoïste: la folle aventure d'un voleur d'art en série et autres histoires édifiantes.  Paris: Jean-Claude Lattès, 2005. 327 pp., 23 cm. .

References

1971 births
Art thieves
Living people
Writers from Mulhouse
20th-century French criminals
21st-century French criminals